The 1895 Swarthmore Quakers football team was an American football team that represented Swarthmore College as an independent during the 1895 college football season. The team compiled a 7–4–1 record and was outscored by a total of 204 to 173. Jacob K. Shell was the head coach.

Schedule

References

Swarthmore
Swarthmore Garnet Tide football seasons
Swarthmore Quakers football